"My Old Dutch" is an 1892 music hall and vaudeville song performed by Albert Chevalier.  The lyrics were written by Chevalier, with music composed by his brother Auguste under the name Charles Ingle. Described as one of Chevalier's most popular works, the song was possibly written as a tribute to Chevalier's wife Florrie.

Background 
The song's title refers to an 1880s colloquialism for a partner or friend.  The phrase has a number of etymologies; two Cockney rhyming slang explanations identify the phrase as coming from "dutch plate" ("mate") or "Duchess of Fife" ("wife")."Dutch house" ("spouse").  Chevalier, however, claimed that his wife's face reminded him of the clock face of a Dutch clock.

As with many music hall songs, the lyrics dealt with poverty and sex differences. When introducing the song, Chevalier would enter dressed as an elderly Cockney man with his elderly partner. They would head towards a workhouse, whereupon the porter would separate them under the sex segregation rules. Chevalier's character would cry out in refusal, "you can't do this to us; we've been together for forty years!"  The porter and woman then exited the stage, and Chevalier would begin the song.

Reception 
Henry Chance Newton described the song as a "famous domestic monologue". Laura Ormiston Chant commented that the song outlined "the finest sentiments of the human heart [...] in a language understood by the people". Lewis Carroll said that the song influenced public taste "towards refinement and purity".

Lyrics 
I've got a pal,
A reg'lar out an' outer,
She's a dear good old gal,
I'll tell yer all about 'er.
It's many years since fust we met,
'Er 'air was then as black as jet,
It's whiter now, but she don't fret,
Not my old gal

We've been together now for forty years,
An' it don't seem a day too much,
There ain't a lady livin' in the land
As I'd swop for my dear old Dutch.

I calls 'er Sal,
'Er proper name is Sairer,
An' yer may find a gal
As you'd consider fairer.
She ain't a angel — she can start
A-jawin' till it makes yer smart,
She's just a woman, bless 'er eart,
Is my old gal!

We've been together now for forty years,
An' it don't seem a day too much,
There ain't a lady livin' in the land
As I'd swop for my dear old Dutch.

Sweet fine old gal,
For worlds I wouldn't lose 'er,
She's a dear good old gal,
An' that's what made me choose 'er.
She's stuck to me through thick and thin,
When luck was out, when luck was in,
Ah wot a wife to me she's been,
An' wot a pal!

We've been together now for forty years,
An' it don't seem a day too much,
There ain't a lady livin' in the land
As I'd swop for my dear old Dutch.

I sees yer Sal —
Yer pretty ribbons sportin'
Many years now, old gal,
Since them young days of courtin'.
I ain't a coward, still I trust
When we've to part, as part we must,
That Death may come and take me fust
To wait... my pal!

We've been together now for forty years,
An' it don't seem a day too much,
There ain't a lady livin' in the land
As I'd swop for my dear old Dutch.

Legacy 
In his later career, Chevalier performed a dramatised version of the song. In 1915, a film version was produced which starred Chevalier and Florence Turner.  In 1926, a remake of the film was directed by Universal's Laurence Trimble.  Turner made a screen test, but the lead role was given to May McAvoy. A third film based on the song was released in 1934, which was written by Arthur Shirley and directed by Sinclair Hill.

In a segment of Beatles Anthology concerning the Beatles receiving the Order of the British Empire, Ringo Starr claims that during their audience with Queen Elizabeth she asked how long the group had been together, he and Paul McCartney spontaneously sang We've been together now for forty years in jest, to the Queen's bemusement.

References 

1892 songs
Music hall songs